Muuga Harbour is the largest cargo port in Estonia, located on the southern coast of the Gulf of Finland,  northeast of the capital Tallinn, in Maardu. The harbour is administrated by Port of Tallinn, the biggest port authority in Estonia. Muuga Harbour is one of the few ice-free ports in northernmost Europe and among the deepest —up to  — and most modern ports in the Baltic Sea region. The cargo volume handled accounts for around 80% of the total cargo volume of Port of Tallinn and approximately 90% of the transit cargo volume passing through Estonia. Nearly 3/4 of cargo loaded in Muuga Harbour includes crude oil and oil products, but the harbour also serves dry bulk (mostly fertilizers, grain and coal) and other types of cargo.

Hamburg's HHLA has had a terminal in the port since 2018. This means that Muuga is networked with the ports of Hamburg, Odessa and Trieste via the logistics group HHLA, also with regard to the Silk Road.

The usual annual cargo traffic in the seaport is about 20–30 million tons. Besides Maardu, the seaport also occupies land in the villages of Muuga and Uusküla.

There are 6 liquid bulk terminals, container, grain, coal, steel and a dry bulk terminals located in the port.

Gallery

See also
Transport in Estonia

References

External links
Muuga Harbour at Port of Tallinn's website
Muuga Container Terminal
Muuga Coal Terminal
Muuga Grain Terminal

Ports and harbours of Estonia
Port cities and towns of the Baltic Sea
Populated coastal places in Estonia
Viimsi Parish
Jõelähtme Parish
Buildings and structures in Harju County